The North Island, also officially named Te Ika-a-Māui, is one of the two main islands of New Zealand, separated from the larger but much less populous South Island by the Cook Strait. It has a population of  accounting for approximately % of the total residents of New Zealand.

Twelve main urban areas (half of them officially cities) are in the North Island. From north to south, they are Whangārei, Auckland, Hamilton, Tauranga, Rotorua, Gisborne, New Plymouth, Napier, Hastings, Whanganui, Palmerston North, and New Zealand's capital city Wellington, which is located at the south-west tip of the island. Wellington is the world's southernmost capital of a sovereign state.

Overview

During the Last Glacial Period when sea levels were over 100 metres lower than present day levels, the North and South islands were connected by a vast coastal plain which formed at the South Taranaki Bight. During this period, most of the North Island was covered in thorn scrubland and forest, while the modern-day Northland Peninsula was a subtropical rainforest. Sea levels began to rise 7,000 years ago, eventually separating the islands and linking the Cook Strait to the Tasman Sea.

Bays and coastal features
Bay of Islands
Bay of Plenty
Hauraki Gulf
Hawke Bay
Ninety Mile Beach
North Taranaki Bight
South Taranaki Bight

Lakes and rivers
Lake Taupo
Waikato River
Whanganui River

Capes and peninsulas
Coromandel Peninsula
Northland Peninsula
Cape Palliser
Cape Reinga
East Cape
North Cape

Forests and national parks

 Egmont National Park
 Tongariro National Park
 Waipoua Kauri Forest
 Whanganui National Park
 and many forest parks of New Zealand

Volcanology
Mount Ruapehu
Mount Taranaki (Taranaki Maunga)
North Island Volcanic Plateau

Other
Waitomo Caves
Taumatawhakatangihangakoauauotamateaturipukakapikimaungahoronukupokaiwhenuakitanatahu

Climate
The climate of North Island is mainly temperate oceanic climate (Köppen: Cfb). There is a subtropical influence in the Northland Peninsula. Auckland and Wellington both receive a yearly average of more than 2,000 hours of sunshine. Snow is rare at sea level in North Island. Snow has accumulated in Wellington on rare occasions, including in 2011. Wellington is also the windiest city in the world. Smog can occur on calm winter days in Auckland.

Climate data

See also
 Geography of New Zealand
 Geography of South Island

References

North Island
South Island